Skully may refer to:

 Skully (game), a street game
 Skully (helmet), a type of motorcycle helmet with a heads-up display
 Noel Simms (1935–2017), Jamaican percussionist, stage name Skully
 Allan "Skully" Skolski, member of U.S. Chaos, an American punk rock band
 Skully, fictional character in Jake and the Never Land Pirates
 David 'Skully' Sullivan Kaplan (born 1979), American drummer, member of the band Razorlight
 John Skully (fl. 1388–1407), English politician
 Vin Skully, producer of hip hop group Styles of Beyond

See also
 Skuly, village in Masovian Voivodeship, Poland
 Scully (disambiguation)